Paduka Sri Sultan Ahmad Tajuddin Halim Shah II ibni al-Marhum Sultan Abdullah Mukarram Shah (died 3 January 1845) was the 22nd Sultan of Kedah. His reign was from 1803 to 1821 and 1842 to 1845.

He was appointed as Heir Apparent (Uparaja) by the King of Siam and invested with the title of Chao Pangeran in 1799. He succeeded on the forced abdication of his paternal uncle in September 1803. He had been recognised as ruler of Kedah by the King of Siam, and installed at the Balai Besar, Kota Star Palace, Alor Star, with the title of Phaya Ratna Sangrama Ramabhakti Sri Sultan Muhammad Ratna Raja Varman on 19 September 1804. He was promoted to the rank of Chao Phya Ratna Sangrama Ramabhakti Sri Sultan Muhammad Ratna Raja “Bodin Tersurin Terwerei” Varman Chao Phya Seraipuri on 2 August 1811. On hearing about a planned invasion of Siam by Burma in 1820, he refused to dispatch the annual Bunga Mas tribute to Bangkok and opened negotiations for a Burmese alliance. The Governor of Ligor then invaded the state on 12 November 1821, and conquered Kedah Fort on the 18th of the same month.   

The Sultan fled to British territory, the Governor of Ligor appointing his son as acting Governor. The British authorities granted the Sultan asylum and a pension, allowing him to live in exile, first at Penang, and later at Malacca. After several failed attempts at regaining his throne by force of arms, he sent his sons to Bangkok to negotiate his restoration in 1842. The Siamese had divided Kedah into four petty states in 1841, from which they offered him the southern, largest and most prosperous portion. He agreed to this offer and was permitted to return as nominal ruler over the much reduced realm in June 1842. He expanded his territory by seizing Krian from Perak on 20 December 1842. He established his capital at Kota Kuala Muda as Alor Star was overgrown with forest and vegetation.   

The Sultan's reign was marked by Siamese rule where its army invaded and occupied Kedah between 1821 and 1842. Local Kedahan Arab families supported the Sultan's efforts to lead resistance efforts against Siamese rule. Arab leaders employed a two-pronged approach of religious militancy and diplomacy to free Kedah from Siamese rule, among which the Jamallulail family played a leading role in these efforts and often carried out negotiations to persuade the Siamese to regain the state's independence.

The Siamese later agreed to restore the Sultan of Kedah to his throne in 1842. The following year, Syed Hussein Jamallulail was installed as the first Raja of Perlis, after Sultan Ahmad Tajuddin gave his endorsement for the formation of Perlis state.

References

External links
 List of Sultans of Kedah

1845 deaths
19th-century Sultans of Kedah